William Henry Ellis is a British actor, voice artist and podcaster known for Great Expectations, Dragon Quest Swords, Queen of the Desert, Parade's End and The Courageous Heart of Irena Sendler.

Life

Family 
Ellis is a British actor the son of Chris and Becky Ellis. He has two siblings, Adam Ellis and Laura Martin.

Education 

Ellis trained at London Academy of Music and Dramatic Art (LAMDA).

Stage 
After graduating from LAMDA in 2005, Ellis starred in British-Asian writer Shan Khan's play Prayer Room at Birmingham Repertory Theatre directed by Angus Jackson. Ellis played 'Griffin', the self-righteous Christian group leader and Charles Spencer in The Daily Telegraph wrote 'William Ellis memorably nails the condescending certainty of charismatic Christianity'.  Ellis then went on to play Benvolio in the Nuffield Theatre production of Romeo and Juliet that toured Barbados as part of Holder's Season in 2006. In 2007 he worked with the director Peter Gill at The Royal National Theatre on his production of The Voysey Inheritance. After a UK Tour playing Simon Bliss in Peter Hall's production of Hay Fever in 2008, he returned to work with Peter Gill again, as Algernon Moncreiff for his production of The Importance of Being Earnest. The play was performed at Vaudeville Theatre in London's West End. The play received a positive reception and Ellis's performance was described by The Hollywood Reporter as '...having flair'.

Following The Importance of Being Earnest he has appeared as Sam Leadbitter in Theatre Royal, Bath's production of This Happy Breed and also played Prince Charming in Lyric Theatre's Cinderella. In 2015 Ellis starred alongside Olivia Poulet, playing 'Uncle Peck' in Paula Vogel's play How I Learned to Drive at Southwark Playhouse. Ellis's performance as the predatory uncle was described positively by The Evening Standard reviewer Henry Hitchings: 'William Ellis captures the discreet, almost courtly manner in which Peck wields his needy brand of destructiveness'.

In 2019, Ellis starred in Frederick Knott's Dial M for Murder, playing the murdering ex-tennis player Tony Wendice at the New Vic Theatre. The play received positive reviews.

Screen 
Ellis began acting on screen in 2006 with small parts and in 2009 he portrayed Wiktor in The Courageous Heart of Irena Sendler. In 2012 he took on the part of Compeyson in Mike Newell's Great Expectations and in 2015, he played The Earl of Chester in Werner Herzog's Queen of the Desert.

Voice over
Ellis has voiced a number of British commercials and was the voice of Toyota for their 2012 Paris Motor Show event: Stories of Better.
In 2020 he narrated two self-help books for the life-coach and author Vernon Sankey, The Stairway to Happiness and The Way: Finding Peace in Turbulent Times, which Vernon co-authored with Katey Lockwood.

In 2008 he played the lead character of 'Anlace' for the English Speaking version of Dragon Quest Swords for the Nintendo Wii.

Podcast

Ellis is the author and producer of the podcast An Open Water Swimmer's Podcast which had its first season in winter 2021; Ellis's guests for season one included the actor and comedian David Walliams and Marathon Swimmer Sarah Thomas.

Filmography

Stage productions 
 Prayer Room (2005, as Griffin)
 Romeo and Juliet at Holder's Season Barbados (2006, as Benvolio)
The Voysey Inheritance (2007, as Dennis Tregonning)
Hay Fever (2008, as Simon Bliss)
The Importance of Being Earnest (2009, as Algernon Moncrieff)
This Happy Breed (2011, as Sam Leadbitter)
Cinderella (2012, as Prince Charming)
How I Learned to Drive (2015, as Uncle Peck)
Dial M for Murder (2019, as Tony Wendice)

References

External links
 
 
 The Boston Phoenix interview, May 1998
 An Open Water Swimmer's Podcast

Male actors from London
People from the London Borough of Camden
21st-century English male actors
English podcasters
English male voice actors
Living people
Year of birth missing (living people)